The 1940 Dartmouth Indians football team was an American football team that represented Dartmouth College as an independent during the 1940 college football season. In their seventh and final season under head coach Earl Blaik, the Indians compiled a 5–4 record. Louis Young was the team captain.

George Wolfe was the team's leading scorer, with 48 points, from eight touchdowns.

Dartmouth played its home games at Memorial Field on the college campus in Hanover, New Hampshire.

Schedule

References

Dartmouth
Dartmouth Big Green football seasons
Dartmouth Indians football